Andrew McPhail (born 12 November 1980) is a Scottish professional rugby league footballer who played in the 2000s.

International honours
Andy McPhail won 4 (1-cap sub) caps for Scotland in 2004–2005 while at Glasgow Bulls, and Clyde Buccaneers.

Andy scored a try with his first touch in his début International vs Wales RL which Scotland won 30–22 in 2004 at Old Anniesland, home of Glasgow Hawks RFC.

Andy holds the record of points scored in a single match for Scotland Students RL with a total of 38 points (4 tries and 11 conversions) in the 68–0 win vs Serbia RL played in Rotterdam, Holland in 2003.

References

1980 births
Living people
Rugby league players from Rutherglen
Rugby league centres
Rugby league wingers
Scotland national rugby league team players